Yesterday the Children were Dancing, or Hier, les enfants dansaient, is a Canadian, specifically Québécois play by Gratien Gélinas.

The story is about a Member of Parliament, Pierre Gravel, who is offered the post of Minister of Justice.  On the same day he gets this promotion he learns that one of his own son, André, is a Quebec separatist terrorist plotting to destroy a statue to James Wolfe in the city.  In the resulting argument, father and son debate their loyalties and motivations in a discussion war over the affections of Louise Gravel, Pierre's wife.

References

Quebec plays
Plays set in Quebec
French-language plays
Fiction set in 1966
1966 plays